A sheep dip is a liquid formulation used to protect sheep from parasites.

Sheep dip may also refer to:

 Sheep dip (computing), the passing  of files through a dedicated computer to test for computer virus
 U.S. Central Intelligence Agency argot for a cover assignment given to covert operatives—see :wikt:sheep-dip#Verb
 A brand of Scotch whisky.